Maujia (sometimes spelled wrong as Maujiya or Moujiya) is a village in the tehsil and district of Mansa in Punjab, India. It is a notable village of the area as a huge operation between the Indian Army and Babbar Khalsa members took place here in September, 1991.

Geography

The city of Mansa, lies 8 km to its north. Surrounding villages includeDulowal, Baje Wala, Chhapian Wali, Talwandi Aklia (Chhoti Talwandi), Gharangna and Uddat Bhagat Ram.

Demographics

In 2001, according to the census, the village had the total population of 1,251 with 219 households, 669 males and 582 females. Thus males constitute 53% and females 47% of the population with a sex ratio of 870 females per thousand males.

The 1991 operation 

In the month of September 1991, the police got informed that there were some Babbars stayed in the village of Maujia. On the information, the police surrounded the village on the evening of 7 September and then intense firing started on both sides in which Bhai Paramjeet Sikh Phulewal, Bhai Khem Singh Fauji (Badal Kalan) and Bhai Gurmel Singh of Raipur were killed.

References

Villages in Mansa district, India